Headline, formerly e.ventures and BV Capital, is a global venture capital firm with an early-stage investment approach in the markets of Adtech, Commerce, Fintech, Media, Mobile and Software. It was founded in 1997 in Santa Barbara, California and has since grown to invest in five different regions worldwide: United States, Europe, Russia, Asia and Brazil. The firm has its headquarters in San Francisco, California, with additional offices in Hamburg and Berlin, Germany; Beijing, China; Tokyo, Japan; Moscow, Russia and Sao Paulo, Brazil.

History
BV Capital was founded in 1997 by Jan Henric Buettner, acting as executive partner for Bertelsmann, and Wolfgang Rose along with Thomas Gieselmann and Mathias Schilling.

Buettner had previously built up the multimedia companies Computel, Videotel and AOL Europe. BV Capital invested in internet companies, among them GotomyPC (Expertcity), which was acquired by Citrix in 2003. Along with raising its second fund, the company moved its offices to San Francisco in 2001. Investments of its second fund include Sonos, nCircle, Angie's List, MrTed, Peanutlabs, and Vuze. The company also established an office in Hamburg, Germany, in 2001 to oversee its investments in Western Europe. Its third fund was raised in 2007 and is oriented to more global investments; the company has broadened its focus from the US and Western Europe to include Eastern Europe, Asia and Brazil, with offices opened in Russia and Asia in 2009 and in Brazil in 2012.
Among the investments of its fourth generation of funds are BlueKai (Acquired by Oracle), Citydeal (acquired by Groupon), Grupo Xango, Farfetch, Munchery, Pulse (acquired by LinkedIn), Sapato (acquired by Ozon.ru), Eucalyptus Cloud, NGINX and Deposit Solutions.

In 2012 BV Capital became e.ventures, adopting the same name for all its international branches.

In 2021 e.ventures rebranded to become Headline.

Portfolio
Among Headline’s notable investments are:

 Angie's List
 App Annie
 Azimo
 Betaworks
 Bird (transportation company)
 Bumble
 delicious
 goPuff
 Groupon
 Munchery
 Segment
 Semrush
 Shopmonkey
 sonos
 SpotHero
 Thrive Market
 YuMe
 Sorare

References

External links
 Official Headline website
 Official Headline portfolio

Financial services companies established in 1997
Venture capital firms of the United States